Peter II (Pierre de Luxembourg;  – 25 October 1482) was Count of Saint-Pol, of Brienne, Marle, and Soissons.

In 1478, Peter was made a knight of the Order of the Golden Fleece.

He was the second eldest son of Louis de Luxembourg, Count of Saint-Pol, and Jeanne de Bar, Countess of Marle and Soissons, daughter of  Robert of Bar, Count of Marle and Soissons and Jeanne de Béthune. He married Margaret of Savoy, the eldest surviving daughter of Louis I, Duke of Savoy and Princess Anne of Cyprus, sometime after 29 January 1464. Their five children included: 
 Marie of Luxembourg, who married firstly, Jacques of Savoy, Count of Romont, and secondly, François de Bourbon, Count of Vendôme.
 Francisca of Luxembourg, who married Philip of Cleves, Lord of Ravenstein.

References 
thepeerage.com Accessed 26 May 2008
 Raphael de Smedt (Ed.): Les chevaliers de l’ordre de la Toison d’or au XVe siècle. Notices bio-bibliographiques. (Kieler Werkstücke, D 3) Verlag Peter Lang, Frankfurt 2000, p. 200f.

1440 births
1482 deaths
15th-century French people
People from Aube
Year of birth uncertain
Knights of the Golden Fleece
House of Luxembourg
Counts of Brienne
Counts of Saint-Pol